Lewis Ludlow (born 11 September 1994) is an English professional rugby union player who plays as a flanker for Gloucester.

Club career
Ludlow joined the academy of Gloucester Rugby at the age of 17. In November 2013, Ludlow made his Gloucester debut in a friendly against Japan and competitive debut in an Anglo-Welsh Cup fixture against the Scarlets, suffering a knee injury which ruled him out of the 2014 Junior World Cup.

He was a member of the Gloucester squad that lost consecutive European Rugby Challenge Cup finals to Stade Français in 2017 and Cardiff Blues in 2018. In November 2020 it was announced that he was the new club captain at Gloucester. He will remain as club captain for the 2021-22 season.

International career
In the summer of 2013 Ludlow represented England under-18 on their tour of South Africa. He had also been eligible for Wales qualifying through a grandfather.

In October 2020 Ludlow was called up to a senior England training squad by head coach Eddie Jones. On 4 July 2021 Ludlow made his Test debut for England against the United States at Twickenham and became the fifth player in history to captain England on his debut. He also captained the following weekend against Canada and subsequently received a four game suspension for foul play during this match.

References

1994 births
Living people
Rugby union players from Bedford
English rugby union players
England international rugby union players
Gloucester Rugby players
Rugby union flankers
English people of Welsh descent